This is a partial list of monasteries of the Carolingian Empire, in Western Europe around the year 800.

Sources

Rosamond McKitterick, The Frankish Kingdoms under the Carolingians (1983), p. 377. This is a map, and excludes monasteries attached directly to episcopal sees.

Notes

See also
Carolingian architecture
Carolingian art
Carolingian dynasty
Carolingian Empire
Carolingian minuscule
Carolingian Renaissance

Monasteries
Carolingian monasteries
Carolingian monasteries
Carolingian monasteries